Mount Arethusa is a mountain located in the Canadian Rockies of Alberta, Canada.

It is located alongside Highway 40, immediately east of the Highwood Pass parking lot in Kananaskis Country, and is a part of the Misty Range of the Southern Continental Ranges. It is named after , a British cruiser sunk in the 1915 Battle of Dogger Bank.

Mt. Arethusa and Little Arethusa form the southern wall of the Ptarmigan cirque which is a popular short hike from the Highwood Pass parking lot.

References

Arethusa, Mount
Alberta's Rockies